Vornado may refer to:
Vornado Realty Trust, an American real estate investment company 
Vornado Air, American manufacturer of household electric fans etc. 
15 Penn Plaza, New York City, also known as the Vornado Tower, a proposed skyscraper